The Haris are people of indigenous origin found in the Indian state of West Bengal. 

The Haris numbered 390,619 in the 2001 census and were 2.1 per cent of the scheduled caste population of West Bengal. 49.5 per cent of the Haris were literate – 61.6 per cent males and 36.8 per cent females were literate.

References

Bengali Hindu castes
Scheduled Tribes of West Bengal
Social groups of West Bengal